The 1992 NASCAR Busch Series began February 15 and ended November 8. Joe Nemechek of NEMCO Motorsports won the championship.

Races

Goody's 300 

The Goody's 300 was held February 15 at Daytona International Speedway.  The #30 of Michael Waltrip won the pole.

Top ten results

 3-Dale Earnhardt
 4-Ernie Irvan
 27-Ward Burton
 45-Jimmy Spencer
 59-Robert Pressley
 0-Rick Mast
 60-Mark Martin
 17-Darrell Waltrip
 15-Ken Schrader
 31-Steve Grissom

Goodwrench 200 

The Goodwrench 200 was held February 29 at North Carolina Speedway. Jeff Gordon won the pole.

Top ten results

 27-Ward Burton
 60-Mark Martin
 28-Davey Allison
 3-Dale Earnhardt
 36-Kenny Wallace
 72-Tracy Leslie
 31-Steve Grissom
 99-Ricky Craven
 1-Jeff Gordon
 19-Tom Peck

Hardee's 200 

The Hardee's 200 was held March 7 at Richmond International Raceway. Jeff Gordon won the pole.

Top ten results

 7-Harry Gant
 36-Kenny Wallace
 44-Bobby Labonte
 17-Darrell Waltrip
 87-Joe Nemechek
 0-Rick Mast
 25-Jimmy Hensley
 1-Jeff Gordon
 63-Chuck Bown
 91-Joe Bessey   -1

Atlanta 300 

The Atlanta 300 was held March 14 at Atlanta Motor Speedway. Jeff Gordon won the pole.

Top ten results

 1-Jeff Gordon*
 7-Harry Gant
 92-Hut Stricklin
 28-Davey Allison
 97-Morgan Shepherd
 56-Dave Mader III
 72-Tracy Leslie
 60-Mark Martin
 18-Dale Jarrett
 29-Phil Parsons

This was Jeff Gordon's first career victory in the Busch Grand National Series.

Miller 500 

The Miller 500 was held March 22 at Martinsville Speedway.  The #99 of Ricky Craven won the pole.

Top ten results

 36-Kenny Wallace
 87-Joe Nemechek
 63-Chuck Bown
 99-Robert Pressley
 72-Tracy Leslie
 1-Jeff Gordon
 75-Butch Miller
 25-Jimmy Hensley
 79-Dave Rezendes   -1
 20-Mike Wallace   -1

Mark III Vans 200 

The Mark III Vans 200 was held March 28 at Darlington Raceway.  The #60 of Mark Martin won the pole.

Top ten results

 59-Robert Pressley
 7-Harry Gant
 75-Butch Miller
 2-Dick Trickle
 34-Todd Bodine   -1
 31-Steve Grissom   -1
 27-Ward Burton   -1
 72-Tracy Leslie   -1
 92-Hut Stricklin   -1
 6-Tommy Houston   -1

Budweiser 250 

The Budweiser 250 was held April 4 at Bristol Motor Speedway.  The #75 of Butch Miller won the pole.

Top ten results

 7-Harry Gant
 28-Davey Allison
 08-Bobby Dotter
 18-Dale Jarrett
 1-Jeff Gordon
 44-Bobby Labonte
 25-Jimmy Hensley   -1
 59-Robert Pressley   -1
 36-Kenny Wallace   -1
 87-Joe Nemechek   -2

Mountain Dew 500 

The Mountain Dew 500 was held April 18 at Hickory Motor Speedway. Steve Grissom won the pole. A record of 26 cautions occurred during this race.

Top ten results

 6-Tommy Houston
 44-Bobby Labonte
 63-Chuck Bown
 87-Joe Nemechek
 17-Darrell Waltrip
 31-Steve Grissom
 27-Ward Burton
 25-Jimmy Hensley
 75-Butch Miller
 48-Jack Sprague
This was Houston's last NASCAR career victory.

Nestle 300 

The Nestle 300 was held April 25 at Lanier Raceway. Jeff Gordon won the pole.

Top ten results

 44-Bobby Labonte
 63-Chuck Bown
 36-Kenny Wallace
 59-Robert Pressley
 87-Joe Nemechek
 34-Todd Bodine   -1
 8-Jeff Burton   -1
 10-Steve Boley   -1
 19-Tom Peck   -2
 1-Jeff Gordon   -2

Granger Select 200 

The Granger Select 200 was held May 5 at New River Valley Speedway. Johnny Rumley won the pole.

Top ten results

 08-Bobby Dotter
 48-Jack Sprague
 19-Tom Peck
 31-Steve Grissom
 1-Jeff Gordon
 87-Joe Nemechek
 16-Jeff Green
 36-Kenny Wallace
 27-Ward Burton   -1
 25-Johnny Rumley   -1

Jeff Burton was the original winner of this race, but was disqualified due to an illegal part. As a result, Bobby Dotter scored the first and only win of his career.

Pontiac 200 

The Pontiac 200 was held May 9 at Nazareth Speedway. Kenny Wallace won the pole.

Top ten results

 34-Todd Bodine
 44-Bobby Labonte
 60-Mark Martin
 63-Chuck Bown
 25-Jimmy Hensley
 30-Michael Waltrip
 36-Kenny Wallace
 59-Robert Pressley
 72-Tracy Leslie   -2
 99-Ricky Craven   -2

Champion 300 

The Champion 300 was held May 23 at Charlotte Motor Speedway. Jeff Gordon won the pole.

Top ten results

 1-Jeff Gordon
 44-Bobby Labonte
 21-Morgan Shepherd
 10-Sterling Marlin
 18-Dale Jarrett
 27-Ward Burton
 34-Todd Bodine   -1
 2-Dick Trickle   -1
 59-Robert Pressley   -1
 29-Phil Parsons   -1

Goodwrench 200 

The Goodwrench 200 was held June 1 at Dover International Speedway. Todd Bodine won the pole.

Top ten results

 59-Robert Pressley
 8-Jeff Burton
 94-Terry Labonte
 11-Bill Elliott
 87-Joe Nemechek
 27-Ward Burton
 75-Butch Miller
 34-Todd Bodine
 9-Clifford Allison   -1
 72-Tracy Leslie   -1

Roses Stores 300 

The Roses Stores 300 was held June 6 at Orange County Speedway. Robert Pressley won the pole.

Top ten results

 59-Robert Pressley
 87-Joe Nemechek
 44-Bobby Labonte
 36-Kenny Wallace
 1-Jeff Gordon
 34-Todd Bodine
 19-Tom Peck   -1
 75-Butch Miller   -2
 25-Johnny Rumley   -3
 8-Jeff Burton   -4

Carolina Pride/Budweiser 250 

The Carolina Pride/Budweiser 250 was held June 20 at Myrtle Beach Speedway. Jeff Gordon won the pole.

Top ten results

 20-Jimmy Spencer
 44-Bobby Labonte
 36-Kenny Wallace
 72-Tracy Leslie
 1-Jeff Gordon
 19-Tom Peck
 27-Ward Burton
 6-Tommy Houston
 63-Chuck Bown
 99-Ricky Craven

Fay's 150 

The Fay's 150 was held June 27 at Watkins Glen International. Kenny Wallace won the pole.

Top ten results

 4-Ernie Irvan
 34-Todd Bodine
 94-Terry Labonte
 87-Joe Nemechek
 79-Dave Rezendes
 36-Kenny Wallace
 63-Chuck Bown
 75-Butch Miller
 8-Jeff Burton   -1
 49-Ed Ferree   -1

This was the first major race run at Watkins Glen International with the new Inner Loop bus stop complex at the end of the backstretch.  The Inner Loop was installed after a series of major accidents in the downhill, banked turn 5 (now turn 9) in the previous years (including a wreck in the 1991 Bud at the Glen that claimed the life of longtime Winston Cup competitor J. D. McDuffie, which, coincidentally, Irvan won).

Firecracker 200 

The Firecracker 200 was held July 4 at Volusia County Speedway.  The #1 of Jeff Gordon won the pole.

Top ten results

 31-Steve Grissom
 20-Jimmy Spencer
 59-Robert Pressley
 87-Joe Nemechek
 34-Todd Bodine
 19-Tom Peck
 72-Tracy Leslie
 63-Chuck Bown
 3-David Bonnett
 44-Bobby Labonte

Budweiser 300 

The Budweiser 300 was held July 12 at New Hampshire International Speedway.  The #36 of Kenny Wallace won the pole.

Top ten results

 8-Jeff Burton
 59-Robert Pressley
 44-Bobby Labonte
 19-Tom Peck
 7-Curtis Markham
 34-Todd Bodine   -1
 25-Jimmy Hensley   -1
 74-Mike Stefanik   -1
 87-Joe Nemechek   -1
 6-Tommy Houston   -1

Fram Filter 500K 

The inaugural Fram Filter 500K was held July 25 at Talladega Superspeedway. Dale Earnhardt won the pole.

Top ten results

 4-Ernie Irvan
 30-Michael Waltrip
 34-Todd Bodine
 3-Dale Earnhardt
 92-Hut Stricklin
 72-Tracy Leslie
 51-Jeff Purvis
 15-Ken Schrader
 6-Tommy Houston
 44-Bobby Labonte

Kroger 200 

The Kroger 200 was held August 1 at Indianapolis Raceway Park. Robert Pressley won the pole.

Top ten results

 87-Joe Nemechek
 59-Robert Pressley
 6-Tommy Houston
 75-Butch Miller
 4-Ernie Irvan
 21-Morgan Shepherd   -1
 20-Jimmy Spencer   -1
 34-Todd Bodine   -1
 08-Bobby Dotter   -1
 49-Ed Ferree   -2

Texas Pete 300 

The Texas Pete 300 was held August 8 at Orange County Speedway. Joe Nemechek won the pole.

Top ten results

 20-Jimmy Spencer
 87-Joe Nemechek
 98-Jim Bown
 34-Todd Bodine   -1
 8-Jeff Burton   -1
 59-Robert Pressley   -1
 99-Ricky Craven   -2
 27-Ward Burton   -2
 1-Jeff Gordon   -3
 44-Bobby Labonte   -3

Detroit Gasket 200 

The inaugural Detroit Gasket 200 was held August 15 at Michigan International Speedway.  The #1 of Jeff Gordon won the pole.   

Top ten results

 34-Todd Bodine
 92-Hut Stricklin
 3-Dale Earnhardt
 11-Bill Elliott
 7-Harry Gant
 18-Dale Jarrett
 29-Phil Parsons
 30-Michael Waltrip
 15-Ken Schrader
 87-Joe Nemechek

During Thursday practice, Clifford Allison was killed in an accident while practicing for this race.

NE Chevy 250 

The NE Chevy 250 was held August 23 at New Hampshire International Speedway. The #4 of Ernie Irvan won the pole.

Top ten results

 87-Joe Nemechek
 3-Dale Earnhardt
 34-Todd Bodine
 1-Jeff Gordon
 15-Ken Schrader
 44-Bobby Labonte
 6-Tommy Houston
 8-Jeff Burton
 99-Ricky Craven
 20-Jimmy Spencer

Food City 250 

The Food City 250 was held August 28 at Bristol Motor Speedway. Kenny Wallace won the pole.

Top ten results

 34-Todd Bodine
 63-Chuck Bown
 8-Jeff Burton
 90-Lonnie Rush Jr. -1
 27-Ward Burton -2
 77-Rick Wilson -2
 36-Kenny Wallace -4
 5-Richard Lasater -4
 59-Robert Pressley -6
 75-Butch Miller -23

Gatorade 200 

The Gatorade 200 was held September 5 at Darlington Raceway. Mark Martin won the pole.

Top ten results

 30-Michael Waltrip
 18-Dale Jarrett
 1-Jeff Gordon
 3-Dale Earnhardt
 22-Ed Berrier
 60-Mark Martin
 21-Morgan Shepherd
 72-Tracy Leslie -1
 29-Phil Parsons -1
 34-Todd Bodine -1

Autolite 200 

The Autolite 200 was held September 11 at Richmond International Raceway. Todd Bodine won the pole.

Top ten results

 59-Robert Pressley
 17-Darrell Waltrip
 60-Mark Martin
 44-Bobby Labonte
 87-Joe Nemechek
 8-Jeff Burton
 34-Todd Bodine
 20-Jimmy Spencer
 7-Harry Gant
 36-Kenny Wallace

SplitFire 200 

The SplitFire 200 was held September 19 at Dover International Speedway.  The #1 of Jeff Gordon won the pole.

Top ten results

 59-Robert Pressley
 44-Bobby Labonte
 7-Harry Gant
 20-Jimmy Spencer
 36-Kenny Wallace
 92-Hut Stricklin -1
 11-Bill Elliott -1
 30-Michael Waltrip -1
 9-Mike Wallace -1
 63-Chuck Bown  -1

All Pro 300 

The All Pro 300 was held October 10 at Charlotte Motor Speedway. Jeff Gordon won the pole.

Top ten results

 1-Jeff Gordon
 30-Michael Waltrip
 44-Bobby Labonte
 14-Terry Labonte
 15-Ken Schrader
 20-Jimmy Spencer
 7-Harry Gant
 79-Dave Rezendes
 6-Tommy Houston
 29-Phil Parsons -1

Winston Classic 

The Winston Classic* was held October 18 at Martinsville Speedway. Butch Miller won the pole.

Top ten results

 44-Bobby Labonte
 9-Mike Wallace
 75-Butch Miller
 20-Jimmy Spencer
 87-Joe Nemechek
 8-Jeff Burton
 60-Mark Martin
 0-Rick Mast
 08-Bobby Dotter
 6-Tommy Houston -1

Both Busch races at Martinsville were held as part of doubleheader with a 200-lap Late Model Stock Car feature.

AC-Delco 200 

The AC-Delco 200 was held October 24 at North Carolina Speedway. Jeff Gordon won the pole.

Top ten results

 60-Mark Martin
 1-Jeff Gordon
 34-Todd Bodine
 17-Darrell Waltrip
 7-Harry Gant
 63-Chuck Bown
 36-Kenny Wallace
 44-Bobby Labonte
 15-Ken Schrader   -1
 79-Dave Rezendes   -1

Joe Nemechek left this race with a 33 point lead over Bobby Labonte with just the season finale at Hickory left to run.

The Pantry 300 

The Pantry 300 was held November 8 at Hickory Motor Speedway. Jim Bown won the pole.

Top ten results

 44-Bobby Labonte
 75-Butch Miller
 34-Todd Bodine
 98-Jim Bown
 60-Mark Martin
 87-Joe Nemechek
 63-Chuck Bown
 36-Kenny Wallace -1
 31-Steve Grissom -1
 6-Tommy Houston -1

Final points standings 

Joe Nemechek - 4275
Bobby Labonte - 4272
Todd Bodine - 4212
Jeff Gordon - 4053
Robert Pressley - 3988
Kenny Wallace - 3966
Butch Miller - 3725
Ward Burton - 3648
Jeff Burton - 3609
Tommy Houston - 3599
Chuck Bown - 3580
Steve Grissom - 3545
Tom Peck - 3512
Ricky Craven - 3456
Tracy Leslie - 3422
Bobby Dotter - 2961
Jimmy Spencer - 2941
Richard Lasater - 2571
Harry Gant - 1887
Jim Bown - 1793
Mark Martin - 1775
Mike Wallace - 1749
Dale Earnhardt - 1665
Jack Sprague - 1590
Hut Stricklin - 1581
Michael Waltrip - 1412
Clifford Allison - 1372
Dale Jarrett - 1304
Ken Schrader - 1296
Jeff Green - 1277
Ernie Irvan - 1237
Dave Rezendes - 1236
Troy Beebe - 1214
Bill Elliott - 1203
Rick Mast - 1182
Darrell Waltrip - 1173
Morgan Shepherd - 1103
Shawna Robinson - 1099
Jimmy Hensley - 1080
Ed Ferree - 960
Ed Berrier - 925
Joe Bessey - 922
Tommy Ellis - 841
Davey Allison - 838
Phil Parsons - 838
Terry Labonte - 666
Mike Porter - 576
Lonnie Rush Jr. - 554
Mike McLaughlin - 549
Jeff Barry - 540

Full Drivers' Championship

(key) Bold – Pole position awarded by time. Italics – Pole position set by owner's points. * – Most laps led.

Rookie of the Year 
Ricky Craven, who had won twice last year as a Busch North competitor in combination races (a common NASCAR regional racing practice;  Busch Series and Busch North Series in the Northeastern United States were combined as combination races), finished fourteenth in points and won Rookie of the Year after being the only competitor to attempt the full schedule. Shawna Robinson was the next contender, finishing 38th in the final standings. Robert Huffman, Randy MacDonald, and Greg Trammell also declared for the award, but did not exceed the five race minimum needed to remain eligible.

Craven was officially a rookie even though he raced in seven races in 1991, two more than the allowable limit of five races.  NASCAR, however, declared he had only raced in two races (the two Martinsville races), and the other five races were entered as a Busch North Series driver, as his car carried a Busch North Series sticker.

See also 
 1992 NASCAR Winston Cup Series

External links 
Busch Series standings and statistics for 1992

NASCAR Xfinity Series seasons